Taraf (also Romanized as Ţaraf; also known as Tarp) is a village in Bedevostan-e Gharbi Rural District, Khvajeh District, Heris County, East Azerbaijan Province, Iran. At the 2006 census, its population was 227, in 51 families.

References 

Populated places in Heris County